Villars-lès-Blamont (literally Villars near Blamont) is a commune in the Doubs department in the Bourgogne-Franche-Comté region in eastern France.

Population

See also 
 Blamont
Communes of the Doubs department

References

External links 

  

Communes of Doubs